Lloyd N. Morrisett (June 23, 1892 – November 25, 1981) was an American educator.

Born in Barretville, Tennessee, he graduated from high school in Edmond, Oklahoma, and received an A.B. degree from the University of Oklahoma in 1917. He earned an A.M. degree (1930) and Ph.D. degree (1934) from Columbia University.

Morrisett married Jessie Ruth Watson on February 18, 1920. They had one son, Lloyd Jr. During the 1930s, he was the Assistant Superintendent of Schools in Yonkers, New York.

In 1941 he accepted an invitation to become the first professor of educational administration at UCLA, where he developed a graduate program in the School of Education for the education and improvement of administrators in a variety of levels of education. As a result, he served as sponsor or committee chairman for 144 candidates for the (Ed.D.), 24 masters (M.A.), and 177 (M.Ed.) degrees.

His first wife, Ruth, died in 1964, and he decided to retire as a professor in the same year. He became a top level consultant to the California Superintendent of Public Instruction. He returned to Oklahoma for a class reunion and again met a woman named Stella Jo Wantland, whom he had dated while attending Oklahoma State Teachers' College (sic) in 1911-13. Their mutual attraction flourished and they married on February 8, 1966. Thereafter they made West Los Angeles their home until his death.

Notes

References

1892 births
1981 deaths
20th-century American educators
Columbia University alumni
People from Yonkers, New York
People from Shelby County, Tennessee
People from Edmond, Oklahoma
People from Los Angeles
UCLA Graduate School of Education and Information Studies faculty
University of Oklahoma alumni